Ómar Torfason (born 1 February 1959) is an Icelandic former professional footballer. He was part of the Icelandic men's national football team between 1981 and 1989. He played 39 matches, scoring 1 goal. He won the Icelandic championship three times, in 1981 and 1982 with Víkingur, and in 1988 with Fram. He won the Icelandic Cup with Fram in 1985 and 1989. In 1985 he was the Úrvalsdeild top scorer with 13 goals.

Football

Honours

Icelandic Championships: 3
1981, 1982, 1988

Icelandic Cup: 2
1985, 1989

Basketball
Ómar played basketball for KFÍ in the Icelandic second-tier league in the late 1970s alongside future national team player and track and field star Jón Oddsson. In September 1979, Ómar joined Úrvalsdeild karla club Valur but did not appear in any league games with them.

See also
List of Iceland international footballers

References

External links

1959 births
Living people
Association football midfielders
Ómar Torfason
Ómar Torfason
Ómar Torfason
Ómar Torfason
Ómar Torfason
Ómar Torfason
Ómar Torfason
Ómar Torfason
Icelandic football managers
FC Luzern players
Icelandic expatriate footballers
Expatriate footballers in Switzerland
Icelandic expatriate sportspeople in Switzerland